Christian Schussele (born 16 April 1824 in Guebwiller, Alsace – 20 August 1879 in Merchantville, New Jersey) was an American artist and teacher, and is credited with designing the American Medal of Honor. He studied under Adolphe Yvon and Paul Delaroche 1842–1848 and then came to the United States. Here, for some time, he worked at chromolithography which he had also pursued in France. Later he devoted himself almost entirely to painting.

His Men of Progress (1857) featured a group portrait of nineteen American inventors and innovators. While all those portrayed were still alive, they had never met as a group but were composed from existing individual portraits. It is now housed in Cooper Union, New York City;

Other well-known works include Clear the Track (1851); Franklin before the Lords in Council (1856); Zeisberger preaching to the Indians (1859); The Iron-Worker and King Solomon (1860); Washington at Valley Forge (1862); McClellan at Antietam (1863); and Home on Furlough (1864).

About 1863, he was attacked by palsy in the right hand. In 1865, he went abroad and underwent severe treatment with no apparent benefit. On his return, in 1868, he was elected to fill the chair, then founded, of drawing and painting in the Pennsylvania Academy, which he held until his death. During this period he produced Queen Esther denouncing Haman, owned by the Academy (1869), and The Alsatian Fair (1870). Most of the paintings that have been named became widely known through large prints by John Sartain and other engravers.

Painter Thomas Eakins covered Schussele's classes when he was too ill to teach. Eakins succeeded Schussele as instructor of painting and drawing at the Academy.

Notes

References

 

1824 births
1879 deaths
19th-century American painters
American male painters
People from Guebwiller
Pennsylvania Academy of the Fine Arts faculty
19th-century American male artists